Ibrahim Arjan Bejte (born 15 September 1989 in Lushnjë) is an Albanian footballer who currently plays as a goalkeeper at KF Lushnja in Albanian Second Division .

References

External links
Ibrahim Bejte at Soccerway

1989 births
Living people
Sportspeople from Lushnjë
Association football goalkeepers
Albanian footballers
KS Lushnja players
KS Shkumbini Peqin players
Besa Kavajë players
FK Kukësi players
Besëlidhja Lezhë players
Flamurtari Vlorë players
KS Sopoti Librazhd players
Kategoria Superiore players